Acacia elongata, also known as swamp wattle or slender wattle, is a shrub of the genus Acacia and the subgenus Plurinerves that is endemic to coastal areas of eastern Australia.

Description
Like most species of Acacia it has phyllodes rather than true leaves. The glabrous, thinly coriaceous and evergreen phyllodes have a narrowly linear or occasionally linear-oblanceolate shape are usually mostly incurved. Sometimes these will appear in the axils of the phyllodes. Following flowering it produces straight, thinly leathery to firmly papery, brittle seed pods that are flat but are raised over each of the seeds.

Taxonomy
The species was first formally described by the botanist Augustin Pyramus de Candolle in 1825 as a part of the work Leguminosae. Prodromus Systematis Naturalis Regni Vegetabilis. It was reclassified by Leslie Pedley in 2003 as Racosperma elongatum then transferred back to genus Acacia in 2006. The type specimen was collected by Franz Sieber in 1823. It is closely related to Acacia ptychoclada and superficially resembles Acacia trinervata, Acacia dawsonii and Acacia viscidula.
The specific epithet is taken from the Latin word elongatus meaning lengthened in reference to the long, narrow phyllodes.

Distribution
It is found down the east coast of Australia from around Kingscliff in the north of New South Wales down to around Eden in the south and inland to around Wagga Wagga in the west. Its range also extends into the eastern highlands region of Victoria although it has become naturalized in a few other localities in Victoria. It is usually situated along watercourses and swamps growing in sandy soils as a part of Eucalyptus or heathland communities.

Cultivation
Although it is not a widely cultivated species smaller forms are sometime found in gardens. They grow quickly and flower within one or two years from seed. It is able to grow in a range of soils so long as they are reasonably moist and will manage in either full sun or dappled shade. It can be propagated by seed but requires pretreatment scarification or by soaking in boiling water. The shrub is suitable for poorly drained areas, will tolerate light frosts and salt spray.

See also
 List of Acacia species

References

elongata
Flora of New South Wales
Flora of Victoria (Australia)
Taxa named by Franz Sieber
Taxa named by Augustin Pyramus de Candolle
Plants described in 1825